Zelyonaya Polyana is a rural locality (a selo) and the administrative center of Zelyonopolyansky Selsoviet, Klyuchevsky District, Altai Krai, Russia. The population was 429 as of 2013. There are 8 streets.

Geography 
Zelyonaya Polyana is located 46 km northeast of Klyuchi (the district's administrative centre) by road. Fedotovka is the nearest rural locality.

References 

Rural localities in Klyuchevsky District